DK (or variants) may refer to:

In arts and entertainment

Film and television
 DK (film), a 2015 Indian film
 Derek "DK" Kitson, a character in the television series Third Watch, played by Derek Kelly
 Dark Kingdom (professional wrestling), a professional wrestling stable

Music
 DK (band), a Soviet rock band
 Deekay, a music production team
 Danity Kane, an American female music group
 Darren Knott, British disc jockey and record producer
 Dead Kennedys, American punk band
 DK (South Korean singer)

Other media
 Diels–Kranz numbering, a standard system for referencing the works of the pre-Socratic philosophers
 Donkey Kong (character), a video game character
 Diddy Kong, a video game character
 Dixie Kong, a video game character

Businesses and organizations
 Democratic Coalition (Hungary), a political party in Hungary
 Design School Kolding (Danish: Designskolen Kolding)
 Digital Keystone, a technology company in Mountain View, California
 Digital Kitchen, a creative digital agency with offices in Seattle, Chicago, and Los Angeles
 DK (Dorling Kindersley), an international book publisher
 Dravidar Kazhagam, a political party in India
 Eastland Air (1991-2003, IATA airline code DK), an Australian airline
 German Banking Industry Committee (German Die Deutsche Kreditwirtschaft)
 Sunclass Airlines (IATA airline code DK), a Danish airline
 DK Entertainment, Danila Kozlovsky's Productions Studios
 Delek US,  NYSE Ticker Symbol DK, a downstream energy company

People
 DK (born 1997), South Korean singer, a member of band Seventeen (South Korean band)
 DK Metcalf (born 1997), American football wide receiver
 Darryl Kile (1968–2002), American professional baseball pitcher
 Donna Karan (born 1948), fashion designer and creator of the DKNY label

 Dinesh Karthik (born 1985), Indian Cricketer
Danila Vladimirovich Kashin (born 1996), Russian video blogger, rap artist and EDM producer
 Keiichi Tsuchiya, known as the Drift King for his nontraditional use of drifting in non-drifting racing events and his role in popularizing drifting as a motorsport

Places
 Denmark (ISO 3166-2 country code DK, licence plate code DK)
 .dk, the country code top-level Internet domain for Denmark
 Dakshina Kannada, a district in Karnataka, India
 Democratic Kampuchea, name of present-day Cambodia from 1975 to 1979
DK, the county code for Dickinson County, Kansas.

In science and technology
 Decikelvin (dK), an SI unit of thermodynamic temperature
 DK (automobile), a Danish automobile from the early 1950s
 Relative permittivity of a dielectric

Other uses
 Team DK, a defunct esports team